The Makahu River is a river of New Zealand's North Island. It flows generally north from its origins in the Kaweka Range, reaching the Mohaka River in rough hill country southeast of Lake Taupo. About half of the river's length is within Kaweka Forest Park.

See also
List of rivers of New Zealand

References

Rivers of the Hawke's Bay Region
Rivers of New Zealand